Three ships of the Austrian and Austro-Hungarian Navy have been named SMS Radetzky:

, a screw frigate destroyed in an accidental explosion in 1869
, a screw frigate 
, a pre-dreadnought battleship

Austro-Hungarian Navy ship names